Mosquito Creek is a rural locality in the Goondiwindi Region, Queensland, Australia. In the  Mosquito Creek had a population of 17 people.

Geography 
The locality is bounded to the north-east by the ridgeline of the Herries Range.

History 
St George Richard Gore registered a pastoral run under the name Mosquito Creek in 1847, which gave its name to the creek and then to the locality.

In the  Mosquito Creek had a population of 17 people.

Economy 
There are a number of homesteads in the locality:

 Ballancar
 Lonsdale
 Mount Bodumba
 Nyora
 Paisley

Education 
There are no schools in Mosquito Creek. The nearest primary schools are Karara State School in neighbouring Karara to the north-east and Inglewood State School in neighbouring Inglewood to the south-west. The nearest secondary schools are Inglewood State School in Inglewood and Millmerran State School in Millmerran to the north, but these schools only offer secondary schooling to Year 10. The nearest secondary schools offering schooling to Year 12 are Clifton State High School in Clifton to the north-east and Warwick State School in Warwick to the east, but they are sufficiently distant that distance education or boarding schools are other options.

References 

Goondiwindi Region
Localities in Queensland